Elly de Waard (born September 8, 1940) is a Dutch poet.

She was born in Bergen and was educated at the Murmellius Gymnasium and the University of Amsterdam. From 1965 to 1984, she was a rock music critic for the Dutch daily newspaper de Volkskrant and the Dutch weekly magazine Vrij Nederland. She also served on a jury which awarded the Dutch Edison music awards in 1972. In 1978, de Waard published her first book of poems Afstand (Distance). She was a founding member of the Anna Bijns Foundation, which awards a prize to a Dutch female writer. She had a leading role in the group of women poets known as De Nieuwe Wilden (The New Savages).

Selected works 
 Luwte (Shelter) (1979)
 Furie (Fury) (1981)
 Strofen (1983)
 Anna Bijns (1985)
 Een wildernis van verbindingen (1986)
 Sara (1987)
 Onvoltooiing (1988)
 Eenzang (1992)
 Eenzang twee (1993)
 Het zij (Or she) (1995)
 Anderling (1998)
 Zestig (2000)

References 

1940 births
Living people
Dutch women poets
20th-century Dutch women writers
21st-century Dutch women writers
People from Bergen, North Holland
International Writing Program alumni